Martinas Geben (born October 20, 1994) is a Lithuanian professional basketball player for Baxi Manresa of the Liga ACB. He previously attended and played college basketball in the University of Notre Dame.

College career
Geben played four seasons at the University of Notre Dame. He was primarily used as a backup in his first two seasons for the Fighting Irish, and became a starter in his senior year. As a senior, he averaged 11.1 points and 8.0 rebounds per game.

Professional career
On 28 June 2018, Geben signed a three-year (2+1) contract with the Lithuanian champions Žalgiris Kaunas.

On 11 September 2018, Geben was loaned to the Juventus Utena of the Lithuanian Basketball League. After averaging 11.5 points, 7.4 rebounds and 1.2 blocks during the 2018–19 LKL season, he received the LKL Most Valuable Player Award.

On 29 July 2021, Geben signed with Brose Bamberg of the Basketball Bundesliga (BBL).

On 20 September 2022, Geben signed a two-month deal with Skyliners Frankfurt of the Basketball Bundesliga. He averaged 14.3 points, 7.0 rebounds and 3.2 assists in six BBL games played.

On 11 December 2022, Geben signed with Baxi Manresa of the Liga ACB for the rest of the 2022–2023 season.

National team career
Geben won bronze medal while representing the Lithuania men's national under-19 basketball team during the 2013 FIBA Under-19 World Championship. Geben won a gold medal at the 2017 Summer Universiade in Taipei as part of the Lithuanian student national team with an 85–74 win over the United States.

Career statistics

College

|-
| style="text-align:left;"|2014–15
| style="text-align:left;"|Notre Dame
| 22 || 1 || 8.8 || .550 ||  || .700 || 1.6 || .4 || .0 || .4 || 1.6
|-
| style="text-align:left;"|2015–16
| style="text-align:left;"|Notre Dame
| 16 || 0 || 3.0 || .545 ||  || 1.000 || .9 || .0 || .1 || .1 || 1.4
|-
| style="text-align:left;"|2016–17
| style="text-align:left;"|Notre Dame
| 34 || 23 || 12.4 || .646 ||  || .767 || 3.4 || .7 || .4 || .3 || 3.1
|-
| style="text-align:left;"|2017–18
| style="text-align:left;"|Notre Dame
| 36 || 36 || 24.8 || .606 || .333 || .850 || 8.0 || 1.2 || .6 || .9 || 11.1
|- class="sortbottom"
| style="text-align:center;" colspan="2"|Career
| 108 || 60 || 14.4 || .608 || .333 || .825 || 4.2 || .7 || .3 || .5 || 5.2

References

External links
 Notre Dame Fighting Irish bio
 College statistics at Sports-Reference.com
 EuroLeague profile
 RealGM profile

1994 births
Living people
Bàsquet Manresa players
BC Juventus players
BC Žalgiris players
Brose Bamberg players
Centers (basketball)
Lithuanian expatriate basketball people in Germany
Lithuanian expatriate basketball people in Spain
Lithuanian expatriate basketball people in the United States
Lithuanian men's basketball players
Notre Dame Fighting Irish men's basketball players
Power forwards (basketball)
Skyliners Frankfurt players